Isa ( or Eissa) is a classical Arabic name and a translation of Jesus. The name Isa is the name used for Jesus in the Quran. However, it is not the only translation; it is most commonly associated with Jesus as depicted in Islam, and thus, commonly used by Muslims. Arab Christians commonly refer to him by a different name.

Etymology
The English form of the name "Jesus" is derived from the Latin Iēsus and the Classical Latin IESVS (written on the Titulus/placard on the [[Cross] - John 19:19), which in turn comes from the Greek  (Iēsoûs). The Greek is a Hellenized form of the Hebrew name Y'shua|Yēšua, which is in turn a shortened form of Hebrew Yehōšua or "Joshua" in English.  East Syriac literature renders the pronunciation of the same letters as ܝܫܘܥ ishoʕ (išoʕ) /iʃoʕ/. The Aramaic Bible (c. 200 AD) or the Peshitta preserve this same spelling. The Encyclopedia of the Qur'an by Brill Publishers quotes scholarship that notes that the Greek name Iesous,  (Iēsoûs), also is known to have represented many different Biblical Hebrew names (which causes issues when seeking to find what Jesus' original Hebrew name would have been from the Greek) "Josephus used the Greek name lesous to denote three people mentioned in the Bible whose Hebrew names were not Yeshua', Y'hoshua' or Y'hoshua'. They were Saul's son Yishwi (Anglicized as 'Ishvi' in the RSV of I Samuel 14:49), the Levite Abishua' (mentioned in I Chronicles 6:4, etc.) and Yishwah the son of Asher (Anglicized as 'Ishva' in the RSV of Genesis 46:17). ... Josephus furnishes important evidence for the wide variety of Hebrew names represented in Greek by Iesous."

Also, the classical theologians Clement of Alexandria and Cyril of Jerusalem both stated that the Greek name Iesous was allegedly Jesus' original name.

There is a major discrepancy between the Hebrew/Aramaic and Muslim Arabic forms of this name, since the Hebrew form of this name has the voiced pharyngeal ʿAyin  or ʿAyn  consonant at the end of the name (as does Christian Arabic  yasūʿ), while the Muslim Arabic form  ʿīsā has the ʿAyn at the beginning of the name.  It is also similar in the vowels to an Aramaic version of Jesus, viz. Eeshoʿ (Aramaic forms of the name, however, still have the voiced pharyngeal `Ayn consonant at the end of the name). [Other Aramaic pronunciations of the same name include yeshuuʕ (ʕ is IPA ayin). Vowels in Semitic languages are somewhat fluid between dialects while consonants are structurally more stable. The vowels in an Anglicized quote "Eesho`" by themselves are insignificant for this discussion since "i" and "e" and short "a" can interchange between dialects, and "u" and "o" can also interchange between dialects. The dominant consonantal discrepancy remains, between Aramaic yeshuuʕ [consonantal y-sh-w-ʕ] and Arabic ʕiisa [consonantal ʕ-y-s-alef].]

Scholars have been puzzled by the use of ʿĪsā in the Qur'an since Christians in Arabia used yasūʿ before and after Islam, itself derived from the Syriac form Yəšūʿ  and ultimately Hebrew Yēšūaʿ by a phonetic change. The Encyclopedia of the Qur'an by Brill Publishers states this has also come about because many Western scholars have held a "conviction that Jesus' authentic Hebrew name is Yeshua'" and because of this they often "have been puzzled by the Qur'an's reference to him as 'Isa". "Esau" (and derivatives with `ayin as a first letter) is not a realistic possibility. With all this in mind, some scholars have proposed a number of explanations. James A. Bellamy of the University of Michigan suggested that the quranic name is a corruption of Masīḥ itself derived from yasūʿ, suggesting that this resulted from a copyist error and an attempt to conceal the Arabic verb sāʿa/yasūʿu which has obscene connotations, though no evidence has been found to support this claim.

Josef Horovitz on the other hand holds that the quranic form is meant to parallel Mūsā (Moses). Similar pairs are also frequently found in the Quran as well which supports this theory. For example, compare Ismā‘īl and Ibrāhīm (Ishmael and Abraham) or Jālūt and Tālūt (Goliath and Saul). It is thus possible that the Arabs referred to him as Yasaʿ, but the Quran reversed the letters so as to parallel Mūsā.

Another explanation given is that in ancient Mesopotamia divine names were written in one way and pronounced in another. Thus it is possible for borrowed words to have their consonants reversed. Another explanation is that Muhammad adopted Isa from the polemical Jewish form Esau. However, there is no evidence that the Jews have ever used Esau to refer to Jesus, and if Muhammad had unwittingly adopted a pejorative form his many Christian acquaintances would have corrected him. A fourth explanation is that prior to the rise of Islam, Christian Arabs had already adopted this form from Syriac. According to the Encyclopaedia of the Qurʼān, "Arabic often employs an initial 'ayn in words borrowed from Aramaic or Syriac and the dropping of the final Hebrew 'ayin is evidenced in the form Yisho of the 'koktiirkish' Manichaean fragments from Turfan." This is supported by Macúch with an example in classical Mandaic, a variety of Eastern Aramaic (hence closely related to Syriac) used as liturgical language by the Mandaean community of southern Mesopotamia, where the name for Jesus is rendered ʿ-š-u (ࡏࡔࡅ), though the pharyngeal ('ayin) is pronounced like a regular long i ("Īshu"). Also the name Yeshu (ישו in Hebrew and Aramaic) lacking the final 'ayin is also used to refer to Jesus in the Jewish work the Toledot Yeshu, and scholar David Flusser presents evidence Yeshu was also a name itself rather than claims it was meant to supposedly be an acronym to insult Jesus. The Brill Encyclopedia of the Qur'an notes scholar Anis al-Assiouty as noting the fact that "In the Talmud, however, he (Jesus) is called Yeshu." Scholar David Flusser and other scholars like Adolf Neubauer, Hugh J. Schonfield, and Joachim Jeremias also further argued that the name or pronunciation Yeshu (ישו in Hebrew and Aramaic) could also be "the Galilean pronunciation" of Yeshua' that came about because of an inability to pronounce the 'ayin in the Galilee region where Jesus came from. Scholar Alphonse Mingana writes there may have been a monastery named ʿĪsāniyya  in the territory of the Christian Ghassanid Arabs in southern Syria as early as 571 CE.

Christoph Luxenberg's The Syro-Aramaic Reading of the Koran equates the quranic name with Hebrew Jesse. However, neither Yeshu nor Jesse begins with a pharyngeal consonant in their original Hebrew forms.

The earliest archaeological evidence of an Arabic name for Jesus is a Jordanian inscription. Enno Littman (1950) states: "Mr. G. Lankaster Harding, Chief Curator of Antiquities Hashimite Kingdom of Jordan, kindly sent me copies of a little more than five hundred Thamudic inscriptions. [...] It is the inscription [Harding No. 476] that interests us here. [...] Below the circle there are four letters: a y, a sh, a ʿ, and again a y." He also states: "These letters are so placed that they can be read from right to left or from left to right y-sh-ʿ, probably pronounced Yashaʿ, and this name is the same as Yashuaʿ, the Hebrew form of the name of Christ." An archaic Arabic root for 'Salvation' exists in Yatha, which may have later formed this name: y-sh-ʿ. The lack of a Waw is still unexplained. Also, the closer correspondence with another name  [y'sha'yá, "Isaiah" in English] needs explanation or discussion before this inscription can be entertained as an Arabic "Jesus".

Non-Islamic uses
ʿĪsā is used as well by several Christian groups in Muslim countries. A 14th-century Persian translation of Matthew, one of the earliest surviving Persian manuscripts of the scripture, uses ʿĪsā. Ahmad Al-Jallad has argued that a precedent of the quranic name ʿsy was already used in a Christian Safaitic inscription from the fourth century CE. Later translations in other languages also follow suit. Some modern Evangelical translations also use Isa, such as David Owen's Life of Christ (Arabic 1987).

Nicolas Notovitch's 1894 book Life of Saint Issa claims that during his unknown years, Jesus (īśa meaning 'the Lord' in Sanskrit) left Galilee for India and studied with Buddhists and Hindus there before returning to Judea.

Given name

Literature 
 Isa Hasan al-Yasiri, (1942) Iraqi-Canadian poet

Religious people 

 Isa ibn Maryam, penultimate prophet of Islam
 Isa ibn Aban (died 836), early Muslim scholar of Second Islamic century during the early Abbasid era.
 Isa Qassim (born 1937), Bahraini Shia cleric

Politics and military 
 Isa ibn Musa, (d. 783) was the Arab statesman, nephew of Abbasid caliph Al-Saffah (r. 750–754) and Al-Mansur (r. 754–775).
 Isa ibn Abdallah al-Mansur (b. 760s) was the son of Abbasid caliph al-Mansur (r. 754–775)
 Isa Alptekin (1901–1995), Uyghur political leader
 Isa Boletini (1864–1916), Albanian nationalist
 İsa Çelebi (died 1406), Ottoman prince
 Isa Gambar (born 1957), Azerbaijani politician
 Isa Guha (born 1985), British female cricketer
 Isa-Beg Ishaković Hranić, 15th-century Ottoman general
 Isa beg Isabegović, one of the largest landowners of the 19th century Bosnian aristocracy
 İsa Kaykun (born 1988), Turkish footballer
 Isa Kelemechi (ca. 13th century), Syrian Nestorian Christian scientist and diplomat
Isa Khan (1529-1599), 16th-century Bengali nobel and military leader
Isa Mustafa (born 1951), Kosovar politician
 Ma Qixi (1857–1914), Chinese Muslim Xidaotang leader, also known as Ersa (Isa)
 Isa ibn al-Shaykh al-Shaybani (died 882/3), Arab tribal leader
 Isa bin Salman Al Khalifa (1931–1999), Emir of Bahrain 
 Isa bin Salman Al Khalifa, UAE Sheikh
 Umm Isa bint Musa al-Hadi, was the Abbasid princess, daughter of caliph al-Hadi (r. 785–786) and Wife of caliph al-Ma'mun (r. 813–833).

Sports 

 Isa Guha (born 1985), British female cricketer
 Isa Аskhabovich Chaniev (born 1992), Russian lightweight boxer

Music 

 Isa Tengblad (born 1998), Swedish singer

Surname
 Abu 'Isa, Isaac ben Jacob al-Isfahani, Jewish prophet
 ʿAlī ibn ʿĪsā al-Asṭurlābī, Arab astronomer
 ʿAlī ibn ʿĪsā al-Kahhal, Arab ophthalmologist
 Daoud Isa (1878–1950), Palestinian journalist
 Dolkun Isa, Uyghur activist
 Facundo Isa (born 1993), Argentine rugby player
 Isabegović, Isajbegović or Isabegzade, Bosnian noble family after Isa-bey Ishaković Hranić
 Ismail Isa (born 1989), Bulgarian footballer
 Qazi Faez Isa (born 1959), justice at the Supreme Court of Pakistan
 Qazi Mohammad Isa (1914-1976) 
Aguila Saleh Issa (born 1944), Libyan jurist and politician
 Salman Isa (born 1977), Bahraini footballer
 Darrell Issa (born 1953), American politician of Lebanese heritage

Variations 
Among some Turkic peoples, such as the Tatars and Bashkirs, the name is spelled as Ğäysä/Ğaysa (Гайсә/Ғайса), or as Aisa (Айса).

 Gaisa Enikeev (1864-1931), Tatar/Bashkir ethnographer, politician
 Aisa Hakimcan (1896-1972), Tatar artist in Finland

See also
 Isabella (given name)
 Jesus
 Life of Saint Issa
 Yeshua

References

Bibliography
 
 

Arabic masculine given names
Arabic-language surnames
Bosniak masculine given names
Italian feminine given names
Spanish feminine given names
Swedish feminine given names
Turkish masculine given names